MV Loch Bhrusda is a Caledonian Maritime Assets Limited  water-jet propulsion ro-ro car ferry operated by Caledonian MacBrayne. After 11 years operating in the Outer Hebrides, she is now a Clyde-based relief small vessel.

History
MV Loch Bhrusda was built by McTay Marine on the Mersey. Her sea trials included berthing trials at Largs and Cumbrae Slip, proving her suitable to relieve there. She started the Sound of Harris service in 1996, but it soon became apparent that she was too small and a new vessel was required for the increasingly popular route.

Layout
MV Loch Bhrusdas car deck provides space for 18 cars. Passenger accommodation consists of a lounge, with toilet and snack vending machine. The bridge is in the centre of the vessel, above the car deck, giving a better view than the starboard bridge of earlier vessels.  

Shallow water in the Sound of Harris led to the adoption of a water-jet propulsion system, rather than the Voith Schneider units of the earlier Loch Class ferries.

Service
MV Loch Bhrusda was built for the new route between Leverburgh on Harris and Berneray, North Uist. The crossing took an hour, initially connecting Leverburgh with a slipway at Otternish on North Uist, the departure point for the previously council-operated ferries to Berneray. For the first few seasons, Loch Bhrusda also carried out these sailings to Berneray. When the Berneray Causeway was completed, in April 1999, linking Berneray to Otternish, the ferry's southern terminus moved to a purpose-built slipway at the northern end of the causeway. Numerous reefs litter the Sound of Harris and a specific route was marked out to ensure the ferry's safe passage. Delays were experienced in poor visibility. as the MCA required that the vessel could only proceed as long as at least the next two marker buoys were visible.

By the end of the 1996 season, the new route was a huge success, with vehicle reservations becoming essential. A further order was placed with McTay Marine in 2002 for a much larger ferry for the following season. When the new  arrived in early summer 2003, Loch Bhrusda moved south to the Sound of Barra, where she replaced . This new route linked Ardmhor on the northern side of Barra to the Isle of Eriskay, itself linked by causeway to South Uist.

In October 2014, Loch Bhrusda relieved on the Sconser - Raasay route so that  could go for overhaul. In 2015, Loch Bhrusda relieved  on the Sound of Harris route twice. On one of these occasions the latter ship had to go to dry dock after "making contact" with the Sound of Harris seabed.

In June 2017, Loch Bhrusda provided additional sailings from Claonaig to Lochranza alongside  whilst  was away at James Watt Dock, Greenock, for emergency repairs.

References

External links
MV Loch Bhrusda on www.calmac.co.uk

Caledonian MacBrayne
1996 ships